Frances Ha is a 2012 American black and white comedy-drama film, directed by Noah Baumbach and written by Baumbach and Greta Gerwig. Gerwig also plays the title role, a struggling 27-year-old dancer. The film premiered at the Telluride Film Festival on September 1, 2012, and began a limited release on May 17, 2013. It was released by IFC Films.

Plot
Frances Halladay is a 27-year-old dancer who lives in New York City with her best friend from college, Sophie. Her life is upended when Sophie tells her she plans to relocate from Brooklyn to Tribeca, which Sophie considers her dream neighborhood, with a different friend. Frances, a struggling would-be dancer working as an apprentice at a dance company, is unable to afford the Brooklyn apartment alone and is forced to find someplace else to live.

She moves to Chinatown and shares an apartment with her friends Lev and Benji for a brief period. Sophie and Frances's relationship struggles as Sophie and her boyfriend, Patch, grow closer. Frances learns that the dance company does not need her to work their Christmas show, which means Frances can no longer afford the apartment. She visits her hometown of Sacramento for Christmas where she sees her family and reconnects with high school friends.

Rachel, a fellow dancer in the company, lets Frances stay with her for a few weeks. During dinner with Rachel's family, Frances discovers that Sophie has quit her job at Random House and is moving to Tokyo with Patch. Frances, on a whim, decides to spend an uneventful couple of days in Paris that she pays for with a credit card. She returns to Vassar, her alma mater, to work as a waitress and summer resident assistant. Overworked and not allowed to take classes, Frances reads Sophie's blog of her life in Tokyo.

One night, Sophie and Patch are at an alumni auction where Frances is waitressing. Frances learns they are engaged and sees the couple get into a fight. She lets a drunk Sophie stay with her in the dorm room she's been given, where Sophie reveals that she suffered a miscarriage while in Japan and is unhappy in her relationship. Sophie goes back to New York City the next morning, leaving a note for Frances. Some time later, Frances returns to Washington Heights in Manhattan. She laments her dire financial situation, her poor prospects as a professional dancer, and her increasingly strained relationship with Sophie.

Frances eventually reconciles with Sophie and enjoys a modest but satisfying existence as a fledgling choreographer, teaching dance to young children, and as a bookkeeper for her former dance company. She starts exploring a potential relationship with Benji and rents her own apartment. Upon moving in, Frances writes her name down onto a slip of paper in order to mark her new mailbox. Her full last name does not fit, so she folds the paper to read: "Frances Ha."

Cast

 Greta Gerwig as Frances Halladay
 Mickey Sumner as Sophie Levee
 Adam Driver as Lev Shapiro
 Michael Zegen as Benji
 Patrick Heusinger as Reade "Patch" Krause
 Michael Esper as Dan
 Charlotte d'Amboise as Colleen
 Grace Gummer as Rachel
 Josh Hamilton as Andy
 Maya Kazan as Caroline
 Justine Lupe as Nessa
 Britta Phillips as Nadia
 Juliet Rylance as Janelle
 Dean Wareham as Spencer

Production
Frances Ha is directed by Noah Baumbach and written by Baumbach and Greta Gerwig. Gerwig, who also stars in the film, announced it in April 2012, though Baumbach's involvement was not revealed until the film's listing in the Telluride Film Festival's lineup. Gerwig had starred in Baumbach's 2010 film Greenberg, and they decided to collaborate again. They exchanged ideas, developed characters, and eventually co-wrote the script. Gerwig has stated that she did not anticipate starring in the film as well, but Baumbach thought she suited the part. Filming locations included New York City, Sacramento, Paris, and Vassar College, which is Baumbach's alma mater.

In the bonus features of the physical media release, the filmmakers reveal that the film was shot both in the style of French New Wave cinema and with the tools of a student filmmaker. Even though the production had both the budget for and access to professional cinema cameras and lenses, they opted to shoot the entire film on the Canon EOS 5D Mark II, a consumer photographic camera that has a high-definition video feature. Instead of adapting professional cinema lenses onto the camera, as other cinematographers have done when working with that camera, the production team chose Canon L-Series prime and zoom lenses that were designed for photography. They shot most of the movie on a 50mm prime lens and a 70–200mm zoom lens, rarely using the 35mm and 85mm prime lenses that they brought with them. These lenses lacked the mechanics and features common among cinema lenses, which (when paired with the large "full-frame" sensor) made it difficult to keep the image in focus. The benefit of using an incredibly small camera and extremely limited lighting equipment was that the production team could quickly and easily move around to different filming locations without attracting attention. Because the film did not spend money on large crews, elaborate sets, or visual effects, they could afford to shoot in Paris, New York City, and in California despite having a small budget.

Soundtrack
The filmmakers included a number of pop songs in the film, including "Every 1's a Winner" by Hot Chocolate, "Blue Sway" by Paul McCartney, "Chrome Sitar" by T.Rex, and "Modern Love" by David Bowie. Modern Love is featured in a scene in Frances Ha that is a remake of a sequence in Leos Carax's Mauvais Sang, where Denis Lavant runs through the streets.

The soundtrack includes a song by Felix Laband and references multiple French films; it contains music by Georges Delerue, Jean Constantin and Antoine Duhamel, who originally wrote for films of the French New Wave.

Release
Frances Ha premiered at the Telluride Film Festival on September 1, 2012. The Los Angeles Times said "audiences seemed pleasantly surprised by the warmth from the often-mordant Baumbach." The film also screened at the Toronto International Film Festival on September 7, 2012, after which IFC Films acquired North- and Latin-American rights to distribute the film in theaters. Frances Ha also screened at the New York Film Festival on September 30, 2012, and at the Edinburgh International Film Festival in June 2013.

The film had a limited release in the United States on May 17, 2013, and was released on Blu-ray and DVD on the Criterion Collection label on November 12, 2013.

Reception

Critical response

The review aggregation website Rotten Tomatoes gives Frances Ha a 93% approval rating based on 186 reviews, with an average score of 7.80/10. The website's critical consensus is: "Audiences will need to tolerate a certain amount of narrative drift, but thanks to sensitive direction from Noah Baumbach and an endearing performance from Greta Gerwig, Frances Ha makes it easy to forgive." Metacritic calculated an average score of 82 out of 100 based on 35 reviews, indicating "universal acclaim".

Stephanie Zacharek of The Village Voice praised Gerwig's performance, writing, "It's a relief that Frances Ha isn't as assertively frank, in the 'Look, ma, no shame!' way, as Girls. And this is partly Gerwig's vision, too. No other movie has allowed her to display her colors like this. Frances is a little dizzy and frequently maddening, but Gerwig is precise in delineating the character's loopiness: Her lines always hit just behind the beat, like a jazz drummer who pretends to flub yet knows exactly what's up."

Peter Debruge, reviewing for Variety, described Frances Ha, "This modest monochromatic lark doesn't present a story—or even a traditional sequence of scenes—so much as it offers spirited glimpses into the never-predictable life of Frances, a 27-year-old dancer." He said Frances was "a character whose unexceptional concerns and everyday foibles prove as compelling as any New York-set concept picture, delivering an affectionate, stylishly black-and-white portrait of a still-unfledged Gotham gal". Sarah Galo of Mic also noted that Frances Ha “is really quite daring in its portrayal of female friendship. Frances and Sophie go through the motions of being BFFs to breaking up to being reunited in the end.”

The Los Angeles Times highlighted Gerwig's foray as part of a trend of female actors becoming writers or co-writers; other examples include Zoe Kazan with Ruby Sparks and Rashida Jones with Celeste and Jesse Forever. Baumbach filmed Frances Ha with his cinematographer Sam Levy digitally and in black-and-white, the latter to emulate in part collaborations by Woody Allen and his cinematographer Gordon Willis, in films like Manhattan (1979). CBS News compared Frances Has style to the works of Woody Allen, Jim Jarmusch and François Truffaut.

Accolades

See also
 List of black-and-white films produced since 1970

References

External links

 
 
 
 
 
Frances Ha: The Green Girl an essay by Annie Baker at the Criterion Collection

2012 films
2010s coming-of-age comedy-drama films
2010s dance films
2012 independent films
American black-and-white films
American coming-of-age comedy-drama films
American dance films
American independent films
Films directed by Noah Baumbach
Films produced by Scott Rudin
Films set in Sacramento, California
Films set in New York City
Films set in Paris
Films shot in New York City
Films shot in Paris
Films shot in Sacramento, California
Films with screenplays by Greta Gerwig
2010s female buddy films
2010s English-language films
2010s American films